Pachyteuthis is a genus of belemnite that lived from the Early Jurassic to the Early Cretaceous, and has been found in Asia, Europe and North America. The type species is P. densus.

Sources

Belemnites
Prehistoric cephalopod genera
Jurassic cephalopods
Cretaceous cephalopods
Mesozoic animals of Asia
Mesozoic cephalopods of Europe
Early Jurassic genus first appearances
Early Cretaceous genus extinctions